Gampola sinica is a moth of the family Erebidae. It is found in Thailand and China (Guangdong, Hong Kong).

The length of the forewings is about 14 mm. The forewings are brown with a strong diffuse darkening in center of the postdiscal part. The hindwings are light brown.

References

Moths described in 2012
Lithosiina